The 2020–21 Penn State Lady Lions basketball team represented Pennsylvania State University during the 2020–21 NCAA Division I women's basketball season. The Lady Lions were led by second-year head coach Carolyn Kieger and played their home games at the Bryce Jordan Center as members of the Big Ten Conference.

They finished the season 9–15 and 6–12 in Big Ten play to finish in eleventh place.  As the tenth seed in the Big Ten tournament, they were defeated by Michigan State in the Second Round.  They were not invited to the NCAA tournament or the WNIT.

Previous season
The Lady Lions finished the season with a record of 7–23, 1–17 in Big Ten play to finish in fourteenth place. They lost in the first round of the Big Ten women's tournament to Minnesota.  The NCAA tournament and WNIT were cancelled due to the COVID-19 outbreak.

Roster

Schedule and results

Source:

|-
!colspan=6 style=| Non-conference regular season

|-
!colspan=6 style=| Big Ten regular season

|-
!colspan=6 style=| Big Ten Women's Tournament

Rankings

The Coaches Poll did not release a Week 2 poll and the AP Poll did not release a poll after the NCAA Tournament.

See also
 2020–21 Penn State Nittany Lions basketball team

References

Penn State Lady Lions basketball seasons
Penn State
Penn State
Penn State